In astronomy, a free streaming particle, often a photon, is one that propagates through a medium without scattering.

Use in defining surfaces
Defining an exact surface for an object such as the Sun is made difficult by the diffuse nature of matter which constitutes the Sun at distances far from the stellar core. An often used definition for the surface of a star is based on the path that photons take. Inside a star, photons travel by random walk, constantly interacting with matter, and the surface of the star is defined as the point at which photons encounter little resistance from the matter in the stellar atmosphere, or in other words, when photons stream freely.

The light which constitutes the cosmic microwave background comes from the surface of last scattering. This is, on average, the surface at which primordial photons last interacted with matter in the universe, or in other words, the point at which photons started free streaming. Similarly, the surface of the cosmic neutrino background, if it could be observed, would mark when neutrinos decoupled and began to stream freely through the rest of the matter in the universe.

See also
 Radiative transfer

References

Bibliography
 

Atmospheric radiation
Electromagnetic radiation